Britannia Seaways is a ro-ro cargo ship operated by DFDS Seaways.

Fire
On Saturday 16 November 2013, Britannia Seaways caught fire in the North Sea trapping 32 crew on board. Helicopters were despatched from Norway were unable to take the crew off of the ship due to bad weather conditions. The fire caught alight in a container on one of the upper decks and was extinguished 13 hours after it broke out. The ship was carrying military equipment to Norway for a military exercise and reached Bergen a few days later. No injuries were reported. The cause of the fire is unknown and under investigation.

References 

Ships built in Italy
1998 ships
Ships built by Fincantieri
DFDS